Winhill/Losehill is a Swedish six-member musical band from Umeå, Sweden led by vocalist Jonas Svennem. The band's name is taken from two mountains located in the English village of Hope, Derbyshire, namely Win Hill and Lose Hill. It is a tribute to the location where Jonas Svennem took part in a folk music camp at a younger age.

The group's debut album is Swing of Sorrow, a double album released on 22 February 2012. The album is dedicated to Jonas Svennem's mother Karin who had died of cancer a few years earlier. It went to #36 in the Swedish Albums Chart in its first week of release. The debut single from the album is 'Tell Her She’s the Light of the World'. 

The band leader Jonas Svennem is the brother of Måns Svennem Lundberg, a well known producer including for Swedish band Deportees.

Winhill/Losehill are releasing their second album "Trouble Will Snowball" the 4th of February 2015.

Members
Jonas Svennem (lead vocals, piano)
Carl Åkerlund (lyricist)
Kalle Lundin (guitar)
Henrik Nybom (drums)
Sofia Högstadius (violin)
Petrus Sjövik (bass)

Discography

Albums
2012: Swing of Sorrow (2CDs) (reached #36 in Swedish Albums Chart)

Track list
Disc 1
Karin's Hymn
Oh Lord
I Will Never Get Enough
Retreat
Tell Her She's the Light of the World 
The House Is Black
Lake Marten
Shuffle Mountain
Those Same Damned Days
Disc 2
Winhill/Losehill Part II
Life & Death
Long Way to Next Stop
Don't Let the Inside Shine Out
I Leave You 'Cause I Don't Care
Inner City Blues
Hope Village
The Heart Is a Mussel
Back to School
Stay Another Day

2015: Trouble Will Snowball

2022: The Grief

Singles
2012: "Tell Her She's the Light of the World"

2022: "Human River"

References

External links
Official website

Swedish musical groups